Jerzy Makula (born 29 September 1952 in Ruda Śląska) is a Polish pilot who won the FAI World Glider Aerobatic Championships seven times.

Career
He was World Glider Aerobatic Champion in 1985, 1987, 1989, 1991, 1993,1999 and 2011. In 1995, 2001, 2003 and 2005 he was World Vice-Champion. In the World Glider Aerobatic Championships 1997 he was fifth,
and in 2007 he won the bronze medal. In 1998 and 2004 he was European Champion. In 1996, 2000 and 2006 he was European Vice-Champion. Additionally, he won Polish National Glider Aerobatic Championships at least 14 times.

He is a member of the aeroclub of ROW Rybnik. In recent contests, he usually flew the "Solo-Fox", which is a conversion of the MDM-1 Fox prototype into a single seater with retractable undercarriage. MDM stands for Margański-Dunowski-Makula.

Glider aerobatics

Awards and movies 
In 2003 he was awarded the Paul Tissandier Diploma, and in 2005 he was awarded the Centenary Medal of the Fédération Aéronautique Internationale.
Additionally, he was awarded the Phoenix Sariensis in 2005.

There are two documentary films with and about Jerzy Makula: Wniebowzięty by Ewa Świecińska (2000) and W chmurach by Maciej Starczewski (2002).

Occupation and offices 
He works as a Boeing 787 captain at Polskie Linie Lotnicze.
 
For many years he has been Vice-President of the Aero Club of Poland and Polish FAI Aerobatic Commission delegate (Commission Internationale de Voltige Aerienne, CIVA). He is chairman of the CIVA Glider Aerobatics Sub-Committee.
Besides, he is a glider aerobatics trainer and accredited as a judge in international glider and power aerobatic championships.

Relatives 

He is a nephew of Edward Makula.

His sons Stanisław and Mikolaj Makula fly glider aerobatics, too.

References 

Glider pilots
Aerobatic pilots
Polish aviators
1952 births
Living people
People from Żory